Verticordia etheliana var. etheliana is a flowering plant in the myrtle family, Myrtaceae and is endemic to the south-west of Western Australia. It is a shrub with one highly branched main stem, egg-shaped to almost round leaves and spike-like groups of bright red flowers with greenish-cream centres. It differs from V. etheliana var. formosa in having longer leaves, and larger flowers.

Description

When the petals open they are creamish-white with a pink tinge on the edge but turn all red within a day or two, then gradually fade to pale yellowish-pink. Flowering time is from July to November or December.

Taxonomy and naming
Verticordia etheliana was first formally described by Charles Gardner in 1942 and the description was published in the Journal of the Royal Society of Western Australia. In 1991, Alex George undertook a review of the genus Verticordia and described two varieties of V. etheliana including this one.

Distribution and habitat
This variety grows in sand, gravelly or sandy loam in tall open shrubland between the Billabong Roadhouse and Kalbarri National Park in the Geraldton Sandplains and Yalgoo biogeographic regions.

Conservation
Verticordia etheliana var. etheliana is classified as "not threatened" by the Western Australian Government Department of Parks and Wildlife.

Use in horticulture
Propagation is usually from cuttings and the plants do best in sandy soils over deeper loamy clay which help to retain moisture. This variety has been grown in Sydney where it sometimes flowers from July to April and appears to be moderately tolerant of frost.

References

etheliana var. etheliana
Rosids of Western Australia
Eudicots of Western Australia
Plants described in 1942